Tales of Robin Hood is a 1951 American film directed by James Tinling.

The film was one of a series Robert L. Lippert wanted to make for television with R and L Productions but he ended up only making this and As You Were.

Filming started 1 July 1951.

Plot

Cast
Robert Clarke as Robin Hood
 Mary Hatcher as Maid Marian
 Paul Cavanagh as Sir Gui de Clairmont
 Wade Crosby as Little John
 Whit Bissell as Will Stutely
 Ben Welde as Friar Tuck
 Robert Bice as Will Scarlet
 Keith Richards as Sir Alan de Beaulieu
 Bruce Lester as Alan A. Dale
 Tiny Stowe as Sheriff of Nottingham

References

External links

1951 films
Robin Hood
Lippert Pictures films
American adventure films
1951 adventure films
American black-and-white films
Television pilots not picked up as a series
Films directed by James Tinling
1950s English-language films
1950s American films